The Man Without Love is a 1929 French-German silent drama film directed by Guido Brignone and starring Gustav Diessl, Ágnes Eszterházy, and Harry Hardt. It is based on the play Kean by Alexandre Dumas.

The film's sets were designed by Heinrich Richter.

Cast

References

Bibliography

External links

1929 films
Films of the Weimar Republic
Films directed by Guido Brignone
German silent feature films
French silent feature films
German drama films
French drama films
1929 drama films
Films about actors
Films based on works by Alexandre Dumas
German black-and-white films
French black-and-white films
Silent drama films
1920s French films
1920s German films